is a 1973 Japanese drama film by Shirō Toyoda based on the novel of the same name by Sawako Ariyoshi.

Cast
 Hisaya Morishige as Shigezo Tachibana
 Hideko Takamine as Akiko Tachibana
 Takahiro Tamura as Nobutshi Tachibana
 Hiroko Shino as Emi
 Takashi Itō as Yamagishi
 Kumeko Urabe as Old lady
 Hideko Yoshida as Kuniko Segawa
 Akiko Nomura as Chi Oikawa
 Nobuko Otowa as Kyoko
 Nobuo Nakamura as Fujieda

References

1973 films
1973 drama films
Japanese drama films
Films based on Japanese novels
1970s Japanese films